The Wombwell Baronetcy, of Wombwell in the County of York, is a title in the Baronetage of Great Britain. It was created on 26 August 1778 for George Wombwell, Chairman of the Honourable East India Company and Member of Parliament for Huntingdon. The fourth Baronet fought in the Crimean War and took part in the Charge of the Light Brigade and in 1861 served as High Sheriff of Yorkshire. As of 13 June 2007 the presumed seventh and present Baronet had not successfully proven his succession to the title, and is therefore not on the Official Roll of the Baronetage, with the baronetcy considered dormant since 1977.

The family surname is pronounced "Woomwell". The 3rd Baronet inherited Newburgh Priory in 1825 from his aunt, Lady Charlotte Belasyse.

Wombwell baronets, of Wombwell (1778)
Sir George Wombwell, 1st Baronet (1734–1780)
Sir George Wombwell, 2nd Baronet (1769–1846)
Sir George Wombwell, 3rd Baronet (1792–1855)
Sir George Orby Wombwell, 4th Baronet (1832–1913)
Sir Henry Herbert Wombwell, 5th Baronet (1840–1926)
Sir (Frederick) Philip Alfred William Wombwell, 6th Baronet (1910–1977)
George Philip Frederick Wombwell, presumed 7th Baronet (born 1949)
Currently, the baronetcy is listed as dormant on the Official Roll of the Baronetage as the 7th Baronet has not yet proved his succession.

The heir apparent is Stephen Philip Henry Wombwell (born 1977), the presumed Baronet's only son.

Notes

References
Kidd, Charles, Williamson, David (editors). Debrett's Peerage and Baronetage (1990 edition). New York: St Martin's Press, 1990,

External links
Painting of Sir George Wombwell, 4th Baronet

Wombwell
1778 establishments in Great Britain